The Rangers vs O'Higgins football match that took place on 7 December 2013 at the Estadio Fiscal in Talca, Chile, was the 17th and last game week of the 2013–14 Torneo de Apertura.

This game could determine the champion of this tournament, because at the same time Universidad Católica, the other club that could be win the league, played against Unión La Calera.

Match

The last match day of the championship O'Higgins visited Rangers de Talca. The local team started winning with Mauricio Gómez goal, but O'Higgins did not give up and as in the tournament, went on to turn the game and got goals from Pablo Calandria and Julio Barroso. In the second half, it was thought that the title was slipping from the hands, because Rodolfo González and Esteban Ciaccheri put uncertainty in the Estadio Fiscal de Talca, where the score was 3–2 in favor of Piducanos.

Eduardo Berizzo, coach of the visitor, made changes and put Francisco Pizarro and Osmán Huerta on the ground, whose first ball touched overcame the Rangers' goalkeeper Nicolás Peric tying the game at three goals, leaving 10 minutes to end the match. At 88', Pablo Calandria was brought down in the area and the referee Patricio Polic charge penalty kick and expelled the goalkeeper Peric and because the team of Talca had made three modifications, the player Hugo Díaz played as the goalkeeper. At the same time, Universidad Católica was playing in parallel and winning against Unión La Calera in Quillota, so if the match was tied or lost, the championship was slipping for O'Higgins. In the 90', the Argentinian Pablo Calandria scored the goal which unleashed the madness of 4,500 fans, which completed the stadium, turning the match 4–3, right then Universidad Católica overcame 2-0 the caleranos.

So both clubs advanced to the 2013–14 Súper Final Apertura, which chooses the champion of the Torneo de Apertura 2013–14.

Road to the last game week

Note: In all results below, the score of the finalist is given first (H: home; A: away). These results only considered the regular phase of the tournament (round robin), consisting of 16 matchdays played since 26 July until 7 December of 2013.

1. The match between Santiago Wanderers and O'Higgins finished with result 2:2, but the coach Ivo Basay put on the match 6 foreigners players, being punished with a 3-0 defeat against. 

2. The match between Universidad de Chile and Universidad Católica was suspended and finished with the result at the last minute of the game (0:1).

League table
Before the 17th game week of the tournament

After the 17 matches of the round robin

Details

Man of the Match:
Pablo Calandria (O'Higgins)
Assistant referees:
Marcelo Barraza
Christian Schiemann
Fourth official:
Roberto Tobar

Match rules
90 minutes.
Seven named substitutes.
Maximum of three substitutions.

Statistics

References

2013
1
O'Higgins